Jenniskens is a Dutch surname. Notable people with the surname include:

Peter Jenniskens (born 1962), Dutch astronomer
Tim Jenniskens (born 1986), Dutch field hockey player

See also
42981 Jenniskens, main-belt asteroid

Dutch-language surnames
Patronymic surnames